Elizabeth Alexander may refer to:
Elizabeth Alexander (actress) (born 1952), Australian actress
Elizabeth Alexander (scientist) (1908–1958), British born geologist, physicist and radio astronomer
Elizabeth Alexander (businesswoman) (born 1943), chancellor of the University of Melbourne
Elizabeth Alexander (composer) (born 1962), American composer
Elizabeth Alexander (poet) (born 1962), American poet, essayist, playwright and professor
Elizabeth Alexander (press secretary), press secretary for U.S. Vice President Joe Biden